Racinaea is a genus of the flowering plants in the family Bromeliaceae, subfamily Tillandsioideae. The genus is named for Racine Foster, wife of Mulford B. Foster and co-founder of the BSI.

Species
Species accepted by the Plants of the World Online as of October 2022: 

Racinaea adpressa 
Racinaea aeris-incola 
Racinaea almeriae 
Racinaea blassii 
Racinaea commixa 
Racinaea condorensis 
Racinaea contorta 
Racinaea cresporum 
Racinaea crispa 
Racinaea cuspidata 
Racinaea dielsii 
Racinaea diffusa 
Racinaea domingosmartinis 
Racinaea dyeriana 
Racinaea elegans 
Racinaea euryelytra 
Racinaea fawcettii 
Racinaea filifolia 
Racinaea flexuosa 
Racinaea fraseri 
Racinaea gentryana 
Racinaea ghiesbreghtii 
Racinaea gilmartiniae 
Racinaea goudae 
Racinaea grantii 
Racinaea guacamayosensis 
Racinaea hamaleana 
Racinaea hasei 
Racinaea hauggiae 
Racinaea homostachya 
Racinaea inconspicua 
Racinaea insularis 
Racinaea jaramilloi 
Racinaea jenmanii 
Racinaea kalliantha 
Racinaea kessleri 
Racinaea laminata 
Racinaea lescaillei 
Racinaea lutheri 
Racinaea lymansmithiana 
Racinaea macrantha 
Racinaea marioportillae 
Racinaea membranacifolia 
Racinaea michelii 
Racinaea monticola 
Racinaea multiflora 
Racinaea neillii 
Racinaea nervibractea 
Racinaea pallidoflavens 
Racinaea pardina 
Racinaea parviflora 
Racinaea pattersoniae 
Racinaea pectinata 
Racinaea penduliflora 
Racinaea pendulispica 
Racinaea penlandii 
Racinaea pseudotetrantha 
Racinaea pugiformis 
Racinaea pulchella 
Racinaea quadripinnata 
Racinaea riocreuxii 
Racinaea ropalocarpa 
Racinaea rothschuhiana 
Racinaea sanctae-martae 
Racinaea schumanniana 
Racinaea schunkei 
Racinaea seemannii 
Racinaea sinuosa 
Racinaea spiculosa 
Racinaea steyermarkii 
Racinaea strobeliorum 
Racinaea subalata 
Racinaea tandapiana 
Racinaea tenuispica 
Racinaea terrestris 
Racinaea tetrantha 
Racinaea tillii 
Racinaea trapeziformis 
Racinaea tripinnata 
Racinaea undulifolia 
Racinaea venusta 
Racinaea wuelfinghoffii 
Racinaea zingleri

References

External links

 
Bromeliaceae genera